Stoletov curve shows the dependence of the magnetic permeability  of ferromagnetics on the intensity of the applied magnetic field H. The curve is named after physicist Aleksandr Stoletov who analyzed in a long series of experiments the magnetic properties of iron rings in the period 1871–1872 during his stay at the Physical Laboratory of the University of Heidelberg.

Notes 

Ferromagnetism